The 2003 Bavarian state election was held on 21 September 2003 to elect the members to the 15th Landtag of Bavaria. The Christian Social Union (CSU) led by Minister-President Edmund Stoiber achieved the largest majority in German history, winning 69% of the seats in the Landtag. This election was the first and to date only time a single party won a two-thirds supermajority of seats in any German state parliament. The CSU also won its largest proportion of the popular vote since 1974, at 60.7%.

The election was marked by a major decline in turnout, falling by almost 13 points to 57%. As a result, despite achieving its best result in decades, the CSU won 230,000 votes fewer than it had in the 1998 election.

Parties
The table below lists parties represented in the 14th Landtag of Bavaria.

Opinion polling

Election result

|-
! colspan="2" | Party
! Votes
! %
! +/-
! Seats 
! +/-
! Seats %
|-
| bgcolor=| 
| align=left | Christian Social Union (CSU)
| align=right| 6,217,864
| align=right| 60.7
| align=right| 7.8
| align=right| 124
| align=right| 1
| align=right| 68.9
|-
| bgcolor=| 
| align=left | Social Democratic Party (SPD)
| align=right| 2,012,265
| align=right| 19.6
| align=right| 9.1
| align=right| 41
| align=right| 26
| align=right| 22.8
|-
| bgcolor=| 
| align=left | Alliance 90/The Greens (Grüne)
| align=right| 793,050
| align=right| 7.7
| align=right| 2.1
| align=right| 15
| align=right| 1
| align=right| 8.3
|-
! colspan=8|
|-
| bgcolor=#007E82| 
| align=left | Free Voters of Bavaria (FW)
| align=right| 411,306
| align=right| 4.0
| align=right| 0.4
| align=right| 0
| align=right| ±0
| align=right| 0
|-
| bgcolor=| 
| align=left | Free Democratic Party (FDP)
| align=right| 263,731
| align=right| 2.6
| align=right| 0.9
| align=right| 0
| align=right| ±0
| align=right| 0
|-
| bgcolor=| 
| align=left | The Republicans (REP)
| align=right| 229,464
| align=right| 2.2
| align=right| 1.4
| align=right| 0
| align=right| ±0
| align=right| 0
|-
| bgcolor=| 
| align=left | Ecological Democratic Party (ÖDP)
| align=right| 200,103 
| align=right| 2.0
| align=right| 0.2
| align=right| 0
| align=right| ±0
| align=right| 0
|-
| bgcolor=#386ABC| 
| align=left | Bavaria Party (BP)
| align=right| 77,390
| align=right| 0.8
| align=right| 0.0
| align=right| 0
| align=right| ±0
| align=right| 0
|-
| 
| align=left | Others
| align=right| 43,562
| align=right| 0.4
| align=right| 
| align=right| 0
| align=right| ±0
| align=right| 0
|-
! align=right colspan=2| Total
! align=right| 10,248,735
! align=right| 100.0
! align=right| 
! align=right| 180
! align=right| 24
! align=right| 
|-
! align=right colspan=2| Voter turnout
! align=right| 
! align=right| 57.1
! align=right| 12.7
! align=right| 
! align=right| 
! align=right| 
|}

Notes

Sources
 Results of 2003 Bavaria state election

Bavarian
2003
2003 in Bavaria
September 2003 events in Europe